Michel Skaff (born 1923) was a Lebanese wrestler. He competed in the men's Greco-Roman light heavyweight at the 1952 Summer Olympics.

References

External links
  

1923 births
Possibly living people
Lebanese male sport wrestlers
Olympic wrestlers of Lebanon
Wrestlers at the 1952 Summer Olympics
Place of birth missing